New Acropolis (NA; ; OINA) is a non-profit organisation originally founded in 1957 by Jorge Ángel Livraga Rizzi in Argentina, positioning itself as a school of philosophy, although various researchers characterize it as an esoteric and post-theosophical new religious movement, or sometimes as a cult. As of 2010, it claimed branches in more than forty countries. As of 2020, its president is Carlos Adelantado Puchal.

New Acropolis has received criticisms for several decades, in particular about its alleged use of paramilitary structure and symbols, and the apparent influence of fascist models on them.

Aims
New Acropolis describes its founding principles as follows:

According to the organization's 2018 assembly resolution, New Acropolis has "three lines of action": philosophy, culture and volunteering.

Teachings 
The organization describes itself as a school of philosophy, which it defines as "a way of life [and] as a means of access to spiritual knowledge and collective and individual realization." According to the organization's webpage, its official introduction program includes the philosophies of Buddhism, Tibet, China, Greece and Rome among others. The school also offers advanced studies in courses such as psychology, history of philosophy and symbology. An article published by the organization in The Parliamentary Review describes NA as an educational charity promoting the renewal of philosophy in the "classical tradition".

Scholar of Western esotericism Antoine Faivre asserts that Jorge A. Livraga Rizzi wanted to create an "eclectic and rational approach" to Eastern and Western thought. In addition to the study of ancient sources, New Acropolis also tries to promote modern authors such as CG Jung, Mircea Eliade, Joseph Campbell, Gilbert Durand, Henry Corbin, Paul Ricœur, Dane Rudhyar, Jean Chevalier, Jacob Boehme, Helena Petrovna Blavatsky and Edgar Morin. Among ancient authors it promotes in its literature are Pythagoras and Plato; it draws on Livraga's understanding of neoplatonism, Alexandrine hermeticism, renaissance philosophy, eastern philosophy (Hinduism and Tibetan Buddhism) as well.

French writer Jean-Pierre Bayard describes New Acropolis as a school of philosophy focused on esotericism and symbolism. It is described by Clifton L. Holland as "a post-theosophical movement that combines elements from many sources: Theosophy, Esoteric thought, alchemy, astrology, and Eastern and Greek philosophy".

According to Peter B. Clarke, NA teaches a certain esoteric apocalypticism regarding the imminent Age of Aquarius which according to the group "will give rise to great pain and suffering at the outset". It has also been described as an spiritist group.

Activities
The organization reported in 2010 having around 10,000 members around the world, in more than forty countries. According to the organization, the governing board of the association is composed of a representative of each of its member associations, and it functions through a decentralized financial system.

The organization's music competitions attract many participants, such as one in Peru which in 2018 attracted more than 6,000. The organization's 2018 commemoration of the 150th birth anniversary of Mahatma Gandhi, which took place in Mumbai, India, was endorsed by right-wing Indian Prime minister Narendra Modi, the Dalai Lama and Devendra Fadnavis.

New Acropolis has been likewise promoting World Philosophy Day seminars around the world; its India branch was supported in this effort by UNESCO.

In 2020, the Peruvian branch of the organization was awarded the Congressional Diploma of Honor by congresswoman Maria Teresa Cabrera, for its educational work promoting culture, philosophy and volunteering.

Organization and structure
According to 1976's Manual del Dirigente (Leader's Handbook) the organization's structure is pyramidal and hierarchical. The highest level is the World Command, an office that once belonged to Livraga. Under the World Command is the Guardian of Seals, under it the Continental Commands, under these the Central Commands, followed by the National or Federal Councilors, the Unified Zone Commands and Branch Chiefs.

The "Golden Ax" is used as a symbol given only to an elite of members known as "hachados" (ax holders) and this honor could only be given and taken away by the World Command. These hachados are proposed by the Central Commands due to their merits and are supposed to refrain from owning a fortune beyond their basic needs. The hachados can request retirement for reasons like age or health, and the organization should be responsible for their living in their final years. A person who retires as a hachado can keep the honors but returns the ax; if the person's status as a hachado is revoked, then the ax is returned and destroyed.

The handbook itself expresses in its page 3 that its content should be kept secret not only from the public but from every non-directive members of the organization. It also establishes that is valid for the leaders to hide their Acropolitan ideas, believes and concepts when speaking in public or adapt them to the listener's wishes, and that most of the symbols, salutes and customs of the organization should be kept secret as other political movements have used them in the past staining its image in the public eye.

The Reglamento para miembros (Members’ bylaws) of the organization establishes a series of norms for the participants including the obligation of at least 12 hours per month of voluntary work (although this can be increased if the person is sanctioned or if they can't do the monthly payments), the prohibition of any kind of critic to the leaders and fellow members "to the former in any sense, to the later in their personal affairs", the requirement of the students to stand up anytime the teacher enters the room, the mandatory use of tie and jacket for men and skirts for women in all official events, and to refrain from any kind of so-called "immorality", among others.

Within a branch there could exist several corps: besides the "hachados" (or "ax holders") there could be "male brigades" who perform manual works, repairs, parades, among other tasks, and also perform defense and mind-control exercises. The "female brigades" who are in charge of social relationships and to keep the "beauty" of the venues. On the other hand, the "security corps" could be identified by their uniform, that resembles the Nazi SS black uniform with a red armband featuring a S and an arrow. Sometimes they carry weapons, depending on the country.

According to a former member in Mexico interviewed in 2014 by Vice, homosexuals are not allowed to be members of NA.

Political ideology
New Acropolis officially condemns Nazism, racism and political extremism, but the organization has been accused of supporting neo-fascism and neo-Nazism. Professor Nicholas Goodrick-Clarke stated in 2003 that "the structure, organization and symbolism of the Nouvelle Acropole [New Acropolis] is clearly indebted to fascist models." According to Jean-Marie Abgrall, "New Acropolis has borrowed elitist and Aryanist symbols and ideas."

As stated in 2010 by Religions of the World: A Comprehensive Encyclopedia of Beliefs and Practices : "The alleged use of paramilitary language, symbols, and forms of organization, along with more recent charges of brainwashing, have led to many criticisms of the New Acropolis in Europe, especially in France, since the mid-1970s.”

The Theosophical Society, of which Livraga was a member before founding New Acropolis, officially denies any links to New Acropolis, saying that Livraga was expelled from the organization due to his connection with "extremism of the ultra right and Nazism".

Cult status
The French Commission on Cults (1995) as well as a Belgian parliamentary commission, have, in 1997, registered it as a cult in their respective countries, in an annexed blacklist to their report, along with 171 other associations. On May 27, 2005, the public cult blacklists were abandoned by the French government. However Serge Blisko, director of the French Interministerial Mission for Monitoring and Combatting Cultic Deviances (MIVILUDES) said to Vice in 2014 that "the French government still considers New Acropolis a cult and it remains under surveillance".

See also
 Governmental lists of cults and sects
 List of new religious movements

References

Bibliography

External links